Missing Angel is a 2004 Nigerian film directed by Charles Novia and starring Stella Damasus Aboderin and Desmond Elliot. Produced by Ulzee Nigerian Ltd, it was followed by two sequels. The plot deals with Dolly (Aboderin), a troubled young woman who makes a vow to God that she should die on her twenty-fifth birthday, if her misery continued. A dark angel (Elliot) is sent to manipulate her, but slowly falls in love with her.

Synopsis 
Dolly was an orphan and poor as a church rat. Her only beacon of hope, who was her junior brother, died because she could not afford food and good hospital treatment for him. Tired of all her sufferings, she vowed that on her 25th birthday, if God did not answer her prayers then He should take her life. The angels of darkness took her up on this vow. She won a lottery and her luck turned around. She became a rich lady with a booming business and her 25th birthday was fast approaching. Her best friend, who wanted her to get married decides on organising a blind date for her with her boyfriend's friend who was returning from the UK. The king of Hades struck. He sent his dark angel to extract his pound of flesh!
What unfolds is unbelievable.

Cast 
Stella Damasus Aboderin - Dolly
Desmond Elliot - Angel
Empress Njamah - Julie
Nobert Young - Pastor James
Tuvi James - Thompson

See also
 List of Nigerian films of 2004

External links 

 

Films directed by Charles Novia
Films produced by Charles Novia
2004 films
Nigerian horror films
Nigerian fantasy films
Nigerian drama films
2004 direct-to-video films
English-language Nigerian films